Diospyros ebenum, or Ceylon ebony ( Kaluwara), is a species of tree in the genus Diospyros and the family Ebenaceae. The tree produces valuable black wood.

Description
It resembles small persimmon fruit. Sap wood is light yellowish gray. The wood core is glossy-black seldom with occasional light fibers. This wood with metallic gloss also has fine and smooth texture. The wood grains can be straight, a bit chaotically organized and wavy.

Habitat
The tree is occurring in southern India, Sri Lanka and Indonesia. The variety of the wood  found in North Sulawesi, Indonesia is Diospyros ebenum Koenig. Known as කළුවර ගස් (Kaluwara Gas) by Sinhalese people due to hard black wood of the tree.

Wood

In Sri Lanka, it is illegal to harvest and sell ebony wood. It possesses the following valuable qualities: high wood hardness (twice as hard as oak), easy to polish (suitable for high-quality polishing, after which it becomes perfectly smooth), it has practically no pitting, provides glossy smooth surface, water and termites resistant. The tree's wood density is extremely high (up to ), which makes it impossible for wood to float. It is also hard to treat both manually and mechanically. The wood itself is short grain, subject to cracking.

Polished wood feels cold like metal. Heat emissions are so high that it causes melting of metal vessels in which the wood is burnt.

Uses
In the 16th—19th centuries the best furniture was made of Ceylon ebony. The wood was preferred for making door and window handles, tableware shanks, while the cutting was used for knitting needles and hooks or razor handles. Today, the wood is used in handmade artwork and the parts of musical instruments that tend to receive the most wear: piano keys, fingerboards and necks for fretted and bowed instruments, pegs, tailpieces, and nuts. It's also commonly used in turnery to make knife hafts, brush holders, and chopsticks. Finally, it's commonly used in decorative wooden inlays.

Protection
Ceylon ebony wood high demand caused the threat of this species extinction. In 1994 the World Conservation Union, currently known as IUCN, included Ceylon ebony tree into the Red Book. However, as of 1998, IUCN has insufficient data about this species. Both India and Sri Lanka have law prohibiting international trade of the wood.

References

ebenum